Theresa Luke (born February 20, 1967 in Vancouver, British Columbia) is a retired Canadian rower. She rowed in the Women's eights in the 1996 and 2000 Summer Olympics. She won silver and bronze, respectively. After she retired, she became a teacher in Victoria, BC.

References

External links
 
 
 
 

1967 births
Canadian female rowers
Living people
Olympic bronze medalists for Canada
Olympic medalists in rowing
Olympic rowers of Canada
Olympic silver medalists for Canada
Rowers at the 1996 Summer Olympics
Rowers at the 2000 Summer Olympics
Rowers from Vancouver
World Rowing Championships medalists for Canada
Medalists at the 2000 Summer Olympics
Medalists at the 1996 Summer Olympics
Pan American Games gold medalists for Canada
Pan American Games medalists in rowing
Medalists at the 1999 Pan American Games
Rowers at the 1999 Pan American Games
20th-century Canadian women
21st-century Canadian women